Schaufelspitze is the name of the following mountains in Austria:

 Schaufelspitze (Stubai Alps), 3,332 m
 Schaufelspitze (Karwendel), 2,306 m